Becky Nutt is an American politician and a former Republican member of the Arizona House of Representatives, first elected to represent District 14 in 2016. She resigned from her seat on October 29, 2021.

Education
Nutt received a bachelor's degree in public administration from Western New Mexico University.

Elections
 2016 Nutt and Drew John defeated Democrats Mike Holmes and Jason Lindstrom in the general election, with Nutt receiving 47,578 votes.
 2016 Nutt and Drew John defeated Anthony Sizer and Dennis Barger in the Republican Primary.
 2012 Nutt ran for the Greenlee County Board of Supervisors, losing to David Gomez.

References

External links
 Biography at Ballotpedia

Republican Party members of the Arizona House of Representatives
Living people
Year of birth missing (living people)
Women state legislators in Arizona
21st-century American politicians
21st-century American women politicians